Coleophora aleramica is a moth of the family Coleophoridae. It is found in central and south-eastern Europe, Asia Minor and the Near East.

The length of the forewings is about 5 mm for males and 4.5 mm for females. Adults have been recorded on flowering Trifolium species.

References

aleramica
Moths described in 2007
Moths of Europe
Moths of Asia